The 2020–21 season will be Diósgyőri VTK's 55th competitive season, 10th consecutive season in the OTP Bank Liga and 110th year in existence as a football club.

First team

Transfers

Summer

In:

Out:

Winter

In:

Out:

Source:

Nemzeti Bajnokság I

League table

Results summary

Results by round

Matches

Hungarian Cup

Statistics

Appearances and goals
Last updated on 15 May 2021.

|-
|colspan="14"|Youth players:

|-
|colspan="14"|Out to loan:

|-
|colspan="14"|Players no longer at the club:

|}

Top scorers
Includes all competitive matches. The list is sorted by shirt number when total goals are equal.
Last updated on 15 May 2021

Disciplinary record
Includes all competitive matches. Players with 1 card or more included only.

Last updated on 15 May 2021

Overall
{|class="wikitable"
|-
|Games played || 37 (33 OTP Bank Liga and 4 Hungarian Cup)
|-
|Games won || 12 (9 OTP Bank Liga and 3 Hungarian Cup)
|-
|Games drawn || 6 (6 OTP Bank Liga and 0 Hungarian Cup)
|-
|Games lost || 19 (18 OTP Bank Liga and 1 Hungarian Cup)
|-
|Goals scored || 42
|-
|Goals conceded || 55
|-
|Goal difference || -13
|-
|Yellow cards || 86
|-
|Red cards || 5
|-
|rowspan="1"|Worst discipline ||  Diego Živulić (4 , 2 )
|-
|rowspan="3"|Best result || 3–0 (H) v Puskás Akadémia - Nemzeti Bajnokság I - 25-10-2020
|-
| 3–0 (A) v Békéscsaba - Hungarian Cup - 29-10-2020
|-
| 3–0 (A) v Tarpa - Hungarian Cup - 9-2-2021
|-
|rowspan="1"|Worst result || 0–4 (H) v Fehérvár - Nemzeti Bajnokság I - 9-5-2021
|-
|rowspan="3"|Most appearances ||  Stefan Dražić (33 appearances)
|-
|  Gheorghe Grozav (33 appearances)
|-
|  Dávid Márkvárt (33 appearances)
|-
|rowspan="1"|Top scorer ||  Gheorghe Grozav (10 goals)
|-
|Points || 42/111 (37.83%)
|-

Pre season

References

External links
 Official Website
 UEFA
 fixtures and results

Diósgyőri VTK seasons
Hungarian football clubs 2020–21 season